Harry Herbert George Watson (29 July 1896 – 25 January 1941) was an Australian rules footballer who played with Fitzroy in the Victorian Football League (VFL).

Notes

External links 

1896 births
1941 deaths
Fitzroy Football Club players
Warragul Football Club players
Australian rules footballers from Geelong